Marie-Madeleine Hachard née Hennebont (17 February 1704, Rouen - 9 August 1760, New Orleans) was a French letter writer and abbess of the Ursuline order. She was one of the first members of the first Ursuline Convent in New Orleans in French Louisiana in 1727. Her letters home to her father in France have been preserved, published, and are valued as a source of historical documentation.

Works 
 De Rouen à la Louisiane : voyage d’une Ursuline en 1727, foreword by Jean-Pierre Chaline, Rouen, Association d'études normandes, Mont-Saint-Aignan, publications of the Université de Rouen, 1988

Sources 
 Édouard Frère, Manuel du bibliographe normand, Rouen, Le Brument, 1860, 
 
 Emily Clark, Voices from an early American convent : Marie Madeleine Hachard and the New Orleans Ursulines, 1727 1760, Éd. Baton Rouge, Louisiana State University Press, 2007
 Chantal Théry, « 1727-1728 De Rouen à La Nouvelle-Orléans. Correspondance et journal de bord de Marie-Madeleine Hachard de Saint-Stanislas », Femmes en toutes lettres : les épistolières du xviiie siècle, Éd. Marie-France Alberte Silver;  Marie-Laure Girou-Swiderski, Oxford, Voltaire Foundation, 2000 (in French)
 Chantal Théry, De plume et d’audace. Femmes de la Nouvelle-France, Montréal / Paris, éditions Triptyque / éditions du Cerf, 2006, 262 p. Voir chap. 13 « De Rouen à La Nouvelle-Orléans : la relation de Marie-Madeleine Hachard » ; chap. 14 : « Marie Tranchepain de Saint-Augustin ou l'art de la réplique » et textes en annexe. (in French)

External links 
 Marie-Madeleine Hachard on data.bnf.fr

1704 births
1760 deaths
Writers from Rouen
People of Louisiana (New France)
Founders of Catholic religious communities
French letter writers
Women letter writers
18th-century French writers
18th-century French women writers
18th-century letter writers
Abbesses